Gregor Hauffe (born 20 May 1982 in Magdeburg, East Germany) is a German former representative rower. He is a three time world champion and a dual Olympian. Hauffe competed at Beijing 2008 and London 2012 in the men's coxless four with both those crews making the Olympic final.

References

External links
 
 
 
 
 

1982 births
Living people
Olympic rowers of Germany
Rowers at the 2008 Summer Olympics
Rowers at the 2012 Summer Olympics
Sportspeople from Magdeburg
World Rowing Championships medalists for Germany
German male rowers